The 2012 European Track Championships was the third edition of the elite European Track Championships in track cycling. It was held on October 19–21, 2012 and took place at the Cido Arena in Panevėžys, Lithuania.

It was the first European Elite Track Championships that had opening ceremony. The opening ceremony was held on 19 October, an hour before the start of the evening session.

Held some time after the 2012 Summer Olympics, a number of elite European cyclists, notably from Great Britain and France were not in attendance, either through retirement or a rest period. In their absence, the medal table was headed by Germany and the east European track powers; Russia, Belarus and hosts Lithuania.

Schedule
The competition days were split into two Sessions.

Events

 shaded events are non-Olympic

Medal table

Participating nations
146 riders from 21 nations will participate.

, ''see: Netherlands at the 2012 European Track Championships

References

External links

European Cycling Union
Results
Results book

 
European Track Championships
European Track Championships
2012 European Track Championships
2012 European Track Championships
European Track Championships
Cycle races in Lithuania
2012 in Lithuania